The Serbian hajduks ( / hajduci) were brigands (bandits) and guerrilla freedom fighters (rebels) throughout Ottoman-held Balkans, mainly in Serbia, organized into bands headed by a harambaša ("bandit leader"), who descended from the mountains and forests and robbed and attacked the Ottomans. They were often aided by foreign powers, such as the Republic of Venice and Habsburg monarchy, during greater conflicts.

The hajduks are seen as part of the Serbian national identity. In stories, the hajduks were described as heroes; they had played the role of the Serbian elite during Ottoman rule, they had defended the Serbs against Ottoman oppression, and prepared for the national liberation and contributed to it in the Serbian Revolution. The Chetniks also saw themselves as hajduks, freedom fighters.

The hajduk movement is known as hajdučija (хајдучија) or hajdukovanje (хајдуковање). Ranks included buljubaša and harambaša, adopted from the Ottomans.

People that helped hajduks were called jataks. Jataks lived in villages and towns and provided food and shelter for hajduks. In return, hajduks would give them part of the loot.

16th century
Starina Novak (~1530–1601), a military commander in Wallachian service, is said to have been the oldest hajduk.

Deli-Marko (fl. 1596–1619), hajduk and military commander in Habsburg service.

18th century
On 26 November 1716, Austrian general Nastić with 400 soldiers and  500 hajduks attacked Trebinje, but did not take it over. A combined Austro-Venetian-Hajduk force of 7,000 stood before the Trebinje walls, defended by 1,000 Ottomans. The Ottomans were busy near Belgrade and with hajduk attacks towards Mostar, and were thus unable to reinforce Trebinje. The conquest of Trebinje and Popovo field were given up to fight in Montenegro. The Venetians took over Hutovo and Popovo, where they immediately recruited militarily from the population.

Kingdom of Serbia (1718–39)

The Serbs established a Hajduk army that supported the Austrians. The army was divided into 18 companies, in four groups. In this period, the most notable obor-kapetans were Vuk Isaković from Crna Bara, Mlatišuma from Kragujevac and Kosta Dimitrijević from Paraćin.

The most notable obor-kapetans were Vuk Isaković from Crna Bara, Mlatišuma and Kosta Dimitrijević from Paraćin. Apart from the obor-kapetans, other notable commanders were kapetans Keza Radivojević from Grocka and Sima Vitković from Valjevo.  In Kragujevac, there were two companies of 500 soldiers each.  He conquered Kruševac with his militia, and carried much cattle. Colonel Lentulus ordered that part of the cattle be returned to the population, the second part was sent to Sekendorf, the third held by the colonel to the need of his army.

19th century

Great Eastern Crisis
During the Great Eastern Crisis, set off by a Serb uprising against the Ottoman Empire in 1875 in Bosnia and Herzegovina (the Herzegovina Uprising), Prince Peter adopted the nom de guerre of hajduk Petar Mrkonjić of Ragusa, and joined the Bosnian Serb insurgents as a leader of a guerilla unit.

Serbian Revolution
Among Serbian revolutionaries that had been active hajduks prior to the Revolution, were Stanoje Glavaš, Hajduk-Veljko, Stojan Čupić, Lazar Dobrić, and others.

List of notable hajduks

This is a list of notable people, in chronological manner. Hajduks who participated in the Serbian Revolution (1804–1815) are also found in :Category:People of the Serbian Revolution.

Early modern period
Grujica Žeravica (fl. 1645), hajduk from Herzegovina and southern Dalmatia during Venetian-Ottoman war (1645-1649)
Starina Novak (~1530–1601), commander in Wallachian service
Sava Temišvarac (fl. 1594–1612), Habsburg service
Deli-Marko Segedinac (fl. 1596–1619), Habsburg service
Petar Rac (fl. 1596), Habsburg service
Đorđe Rac (fl. 1596), Habsburg service
Mihailo Rac (fl. 1596), Habsburg service
Kuzman Rac (fl. 1596), Habsburg service
Nikola Rac (fl. 1596), Habsburg service
Vuk Rac (fl. 1596), Habsburg service
Đorđe Slankamenac (fl. 1596), Habsburg service
Živko Crni
Grdan (fl. 1596–d. 1612)
Teodor of Vršac, Sava Ban and Velja Mironić ( 1594), raised the Uprising in Banat
Jovan Rac (fl. 1653)
Bajo Pivljanin (fl. 1669 – died 1685), commander in Venetian service during the Cretan War
Jovan Monasterlija (fl. 1689–1706), commander in Austrian service
Arnold Paole (d. 1726), militiaman in Austrian service, noted as alleged vampire
Vuk Isakovič (fl. 1696–1759), commander in Austrian service
Nikac Tomanović (fl. 1695–1755), commander in Montenegro
Koča Anđelković (1755–1789), commander in Austrian service, led the Koča's frontier rebellion
Stanko Arambašić (1764–1798), commander of Serb officers in Ottoman service
Lazar Dobrić (fl. 1790),

Serbian Revolution
Karađorđe (1768–1817), leader of the First Serbian Uprising and founder of modern Serbia
Stanoje Glavaš (1763–1815), vojvoda in the First Serbian Uprising
Stojan Čupić, vojvoda in the First Serbian Uprising
Đorđe Ćurčija (d. 1804), vojvoda in the First Serbian Uprising
Hajduk Veljko (c. 1780–1813), vojvoda in the First Serbian Uprising
Stojan Abraš (1780-1813) participated as one of the leaders in the First Serbian Uprising
Pavle Irić
Jovan Mićić
Petronije Šišo

Rebels in Bosnia and Herzegovina
Jovan Šibalija (fl. 1804–15), rebel leader in Drobnjaci, participated in the First Serbian Uprising
Šujo Karadžić (fl. 1804–15), rebel leader in Drobnjaci, participated in the First Serbian Uprising
Joko Kusovac (d. 1863), priest, serdar and rebel leader
Petar Popović–Pecija (1826–1875), led the Doljani Revolt (1858) and Bosanska Krajina Uprising (1875–78)
Luka Vukalović (1823–1873), led the Herzegovina Uprising (1852–62)
Mićo Ljubibratić (1839–1889), participated in the Herzegovina Uprising (1852–62)
Pero Tunguz (fl. 1875),
Lazo Škundrić (fl. 1875),
Petko Kovačević (fl. 1875),
Prodan Rupar (1815–1877), leader in the Herzegovina Uprising (1875–77)
Draga Mastilović (d. 1877), rebel leader
Golub Babić (1824–1910), rebel leader in Western Bosnia.
Stojan Kovačević (1821–1911),

Rebels in Old Serbia and Macedonia
Čakr-paša
Velika Begovica
Spiro Crne
Micko Krstić
Gligor Sokolović (1872–1910), in Ottoman Macedonia

Literature

Hajduks in epic poetry

In Serbian epic poetry, the hajduks are cherished as heroes, freedom fighters against the Ottoman rule. There is a whole cyclus regarding the hajduks and uskoks. Among the most notable hajduks in the epics were Starina Novak, Mali Radojica, Stari Vujadin, Predrag and Nenad, Novak, Grujica Žeravica, etc.

Novels
Hajduks are the theme of many novels, such as Branislav Nušić's Hajduci (1955), Miljanov et al. Srpski hajduci (1996), etc.

See also
Jovan Nenad, military commander in Hungarian service who revolted and declared his own state
Radoslav Čelnik, Jovan Nenad's subcommander, likewise declared Syrmia his own state
Jovo Stanisavljević Čaruga (1897–1925), Slavonian outlaw

References

Further reading
Коцић, М. (2013). Венеција и хајдуци у доба Морејског рата.
Милошевић, М. (1988). Хајдуци у Боки Которској 1648–1718. Титоград, ЦАНУ.
Стојановић, М., & Samardžić, R. (1984). Хајдуци и клефти у народном песништву. Српска академија наука и уметности, Балканолошки институт.
Popović, D. J. (1930). O hajducima (Vol. 1). Narodna štampanja.
Žanić, I. (1998). Prevarena povijest: guslarska estrada, kult hajduka i rat u Hrvatskoj i Bosni i Hercegovini, 1990-1995. godine. Durieux.
Bracewell, W. (2005). 'Hajduci kao heroji u balkanskoj politici i kulturi'(trans. of" The Proud Name of Hajduk").

Serbian rebels
Serbian folklore
Serbian military personnel
Serbian soldiers
Serbian guerrillas
Ottoman Serbia
Serbia under Habsburg rule
Serbian culture
Characters in Serbian epic poetry